Sonny Spoon is an American crime drama television series that aired on NBC television network from February 12 to December 16, 1988. The series was created by Michael Daly, Dinah Prince, Stephen J. Cannell, and Randall Wallace and produced by Stephen J. Cannell Productions (the fall 1988 episodes were in association with NBC Productions).

Overview
Sonny Spoon stars Mario Van Peebles as Sonny, a hip, black private investigator who uses his street smarts and "cool" persona to solve crimes.  He often assists, and is assisted by, Carolyn Gilder (Terry Donahoe), an attractive assistant district attorney.  Additionally, Sonny was a master of disguises, and might spend part of any given episode dressed as a clergyman, an Arab tourist, or an old lady.  He used his many connections on the streets and relationships with friends and informants (who were apparently attracted to him mostly by his vibrant personality, as he had little cash to share with them) to further his ends, and also the insights of his father, Mel, a bar owner (played by Melvin Van Peebles, Mario's real-life father).

Cast
 Mario Van Peebles as Sonny Spoon
 Melvin Van Peebles as Mel Spoon
 Terry Donahoe as Carolyn Gilder
 Jordana Capra as Monique
 Bob Wieland as Johnny Skates
 Larry Friel as Det. Bartlett

Episodes

Season 1 (1988)

Season 2 (1988)

Production
Sonny Spoon began its run as a mid-season replacement in February 1988, and was renewed for a second season. It did not sustain its early momentum and was canceled in December 1988.

Broadcast history

References

Sources
 Brooks, Tim and Marsh, Earle, The Complete Directory to Prime Time Network and Cable TV Shows

External links

1988 American television series debuts
1988 American television series endings
NBC original programming
Television series by Stephen J. Cannell Productions
Television series by Universal Television
Television series by 20th Century Fox Television
1980s American crime drama television series
English-language television shows
Television shows set in Los Angeles